In public transport, bus bunching, clumping, convoying, piggybacking or platooning is a phenomenon whereby two or more transit vehicles (such as buses or trains) that were scheduled at regular intervals along a common route instead bunch together and form a platoon. This occurs when leading vehicles are unable to keep their schedule and fall behind to such an extent that trailing vehicles catch up to them.

Theory
A bus that is running slightly late will, in addition to its normal load, pick up passengers who would have taken the next bus if the first bus had not been late. These extra passengers delay the first bus even further. In contrast, the bus behind the late bus has a lighter passenger load than it otherwise would have, and may therefore run ahead of schedule. The classical theory causal model for irregular intervals is based on the observation that a late bus tends to get later and later as it completes its run, while the bus following it tends to get earlier and earlier. Eventually these buses form a pair, one right after another, and the service deteriorates as the headway degrades from its nominal value. The buses that are stuck together are called a bus bunch or banana bus; this may also involve more than two buses. This effect is often theorised to be the primary cause of reliability problems on bus and metro systems.

Simulation studies have successfully demonstrated the extent of possible factors influencing bus bunching, and they may also be used to understand the impact of actions taken to overcome negative effects of bunching.

Hypothesized causes
Clumping can be caused by random heavy usage of any particular vehicle, resulting in it falling behind schedule. The leading vehicle eventually lapses towards the time slot of a later scheduled vehicle. Sometimes, the later scheduled vehicle gets ahead of its own timetable, and the two vehicles meet between their scheduled times. Sometimes one scheduled vehicle may pass another.

Corrective measures
Clumping can be prevented or reduced as follows:
Scheduling minimum and maximum amounts of time at each stop
Scheduling some crowded runs to skip certain stops
If, on a popular route with frequent service, a crowded vehicle arrives, passengers can be urged to wait for the next vehicle, which may be less crowded.

A different approach is to abandon the idea of a schedule and keep buses equally spaced by strategically delaying them at designated stops. This is used to control the buses on the campus of Northern Arizona University, where it  outperforms the previously scheduled system.

A queueing theory paper in 1984 on multiple server cyclic queues observed the bus bunching effects and proposed a method called "dispersive schedules" to alleviate it.

Merely adding more vehicles to the schedule without making other changes has been proven not to be a reliable solution to the problem of bunching.

See also
 Accordion effect
 Matthew effect
 Positive feedback
 Wait/walk dilemma

References

External links
 SBS Transit Explanation of Bus Bunching

Chaos theory
Public transport
Transport reliability
Transportation planning
Scheduling (transportation)
Bus terminology